is a brackish lagoon in Shizuoka Prefecture, Japan.  Formerly a true lake, it is now connected to the Pacific Ocean by a channel.  As an internal body of water, it is considered Japan's tenth-largest lake (by area). It spans the boundaries of the cities of Hamamatsu and Kosai.

Data
The lake has an area of 65.0 km2 and holds 0.35 km3 of water. Its circumference is 114 km. At its deepest point, the water is 16.6 m deep. The surface is at sea level.

Economic activity
Lake Hamana is a commercial source of cultivated Japanese eel, nori, oysters and Chinese soft-shelled turtles. Fishers take sea bass, whiting, and flounder, among others. The lake has been developed as a resort area, with boating as a feature.

History

In ancient times, Lake Hamana was a freshwater lake. However, the 1498 Meiō Nankaidō earthquake altered the topography of the area and connected the lake to the ocean. As a result, the water in the lake is now brackish.

From the perspective of the capital in the Kinai, Tōtōmi is more distant than the other famous lake,  or Ōmi (now Lake Biwa), the "nearby fresh-water lake." The name Tōtōmi was also used for a former province in which the lake is located (Tōtōmi Province).

At the end of World War II two experimental Type 4 Chi-To tanks were dumped into the lake to avoid capture by Occupation forces. One was recovered by the US Army, but the other was left in the lake. In 2013, unsuccessful efforts were made to locate the remaining tank.

References

Sources
This article incorporates material from the article 浜名湖 (Hamanako) in the Japanese Wikipedia, retrieved on December 11, 2007.

External links

   (Hamanako), Ministry of Land, Infrastructure and Transport (Japan)
   (Hamanako Cycling Road), Ministry of Land, Infrastructure and Transport (Japan)

Hamana
Landforms of Shizuoka Prefecture